The Adidas Cup 1997 was the seventh competition of the Korean League Cup, and one of two Korean League Cups held in 1997.

Table

Matches

Awards

Source:

See also
1997 in South Korean football
1997 Korean League Cup (Supplementary Cup)
1997 K League
1997 Korean FA Cup

References

External links
Official website
RSSSF

1997
1997
1997 domestic association football cups
1997 in South Korean sport